{{safesubst:#invoke:RfD||2=Student achievement|month = March
|day =  8
|year = 2023
|time = 20:37
|timestamp = 20230308203727

|content=
REDIRECT Grading in education

}}